Gongylomorphus fontenayi is a small species of skink, a lizard in the family Scincidae. The species is endemic to Mauritius.

References

External links
Reptile Database - Gongylomorphus fontenayi.

Gongylomorphus
Reptiles of Mauritius
Reptiles described in 1973